Paramapadham Vilayattu also  shortly Paramapadham is a 2021 Indian Tamil-language political thriller film directed by Thirugnanam. The film's release date has been postponed from its original date February 28, 2020 for unexplained reasons. A year later, the film's theatrical release was cancelled and it was decided to release the film via Disney+ Hotstar on 14 April 2021, during the occasion of Puthandu. It failed to impresse the audience due lack of better plot and was a box office bomb.

Plot 
Chezhiyan (Vela Ramamoorthy), the Chief Minister of the state who enjoys a massive following, is hospitalised and his political party is on the verge of splitting into two. Amidst heated discussion among the party members on who should be the next CM, Gayatri (Trisha), the doctor who treated the CM, suspects foul play in the former's death. She secures evidence related to the suspicious death, but gets kidnapped along with her daughter Suji (Baby Manasvi).

Cast 
 Trisha as Dr. Gayathri
 Vijay Varmaa as cab driver
 Nandha Durairaj as Tamizhselvan
 Richard Rishi as Tamizhselvan's sidekick
 A. L. Azhagappan as Kalingan
 Baby Manasvi as Suji, Gayathri's daughter 
 Vela Ramamoorthy as Chezhiyan, the Chief Minister and Tamizhselvan's father who gets killed by his son Tamizhselvan
 Chaams as Kalingan's assistant
 Sangeetha as Priya
 Deepa Shankar as Chezhiyan's supporter
 Cheran Raj as Police inspector
 Sona Heiden as Manimozhi
 Nellai Siva as politician
Citizen Mani as politician 
Thavasi as politician 
Chevvazhai

Production 
The project is produced by 24HRS Productions Entertainment.

Soundtrack
Soundtrack was composed by Amresh Ganesh. It features only one song, "Dhongana Koduka", sung by Amresh and Bhargavi.

Critical reception
The film received mostly negative reviews from critics. Times of India wrote "With a not-so-bad plot, the movie goes on to become a tiresome watch as the story progresses, thanks to unengaging and predictable sequences." India Today wrote "Director Thirugnanam’s story is so predictable that even a kid who watches the film would guess the so-called twists from a mile away. Any story needs to have high and low points to make the proceedings interesting. Paramapadham Vilayattu has literally nothing to make you go wow." FirstPost wrote "There is nothing in Paramapadham Vilayattu that we've never seen before. The plot and the politics are excruciatingly stale. The scenes are misplaced versions of real-life incidents. The characters are plastic. Overall, the film is barely watchable."

References

External links 
 

2021 films
Films not released in theaters due to the COVID-19 pandemic
Indian political thriller films
Disney+ Hotstar original films
Indian direct-to-video films
2021 direct-to-video films